is a Japanese voice actor, actor and singer. His most well-known characters are Tetsuya Kuroko, the titular protagonist in the anime series Kuroko's Basketball, Giorno Giovanna in JoJo's Bizarre Adventure, Slaine Troyard in Aldnoah.Zero, Yuya Sakaki in Yu-Gi-Oh! Arc-V, Hakuryu Ren in Magi: The Labyrinth of Magic and Mikaela Hyakuya in Seraph of the End. He is also known as the Japanese dub voice of Harry Potter (played by Daniel Radcliffe) in the Harry Potter film series, and as Muromachi Tōji in the Prince of Tennis musical, as well as the Japanese voice for Diluc, from the open-world RPG, Genshin Impact.

Career
Ono became a voice actor and starred in Toshiie to Matsu.

In February 2014, he launched a singing career with the single "Fantastic Tune". Since then, he has released four singles, two mini albums, and one full album. His fifth solo single "Five Star" was released through Lantis on June 27, 2018, after which he announced a summer tour titled 'Ono Kensho Live Tour 2018'.

Ono was previously represented by Sunaoka Office, a subsidiary of Gekidan Himawari; however, he is now represented by Amino Produce. He has also appeared in various anime and Japanese TV drama series. His 1st television Show was Fafner in the Azure: Dead Aggressor (2004).

In 2022, Ono won the Best Lead Actor Award at the 16th Seiyu Awards.

Personal life

In February 2017, Ono and Kana Hanazawa confirmed that they were dating during a live stream promoting Hanazawa's album release, after Shūkan Bunshun published allegations about their relationship. On July 8, 2020, they announced that they married.

Filmography

Films
 Shōnen H (2013) – Icchan
 Hōtai Club (2007)
 Dive!! (2008)
 ReLIFE (2017)

Dramas
 Taiga drama: Toshiie and Matsu (2002) – Maeda Magoshirō (Eps. 15–17)
 Taiga drama: Fūrin Kazan (2007) – Yoriyuki Suwa (Eps. 14–15)
 Ballad of a Shinigami – Maruyama
 Iwo Jima – Iwao Yamada
 Detective School Q – Junya Kameda (Eps. 4–5)
 Hakata Stay Hungry – 
 Fujoshi, Ukkari Gay ni Kokuru (2019) - Mr. Fahrenheit (voice)

Anime series

2006
 Tsubasa Chronicle – Chaos
2007
 Moribito: Guardian of the Spirit – Yāsamu
 Shinreigari/Ghost Hound – Komori Taro
2008
 Monochrome Factor – George
 Pocket Monsters: Diamond & Pearl – Ryō
2009
 Michiko to Hatchin – Lenine
2012
 Kuroko's Basketball – Kuroko Tetsuya 
 Magi: The Labyrinth of Magic – Ren Hakuryuu 
2013
 Gingitsune – Satoru Kamio
 Kuroko's Basketball 2 – Kuroko Tetsuya 
 Magi: The Kingdom of Magic – Ren Hakuryuu 
 Makai Ouji: Devils and Realist – Leonard
2014
 Ace of Diamond – Todoroki Raichi
 Aldnoah.Zero – Troyard Slaine
 Bakumatsu Rock – Okita Sōji 
 Pokémon XY: Mega Evolution – Alain
 Shounen Hollywood: Holly Stage for 49 – Maiyama Shun 
 Yu-Gi-Oh! ARC-V – Yuya Sakaki, Yuri
2015
 Ace of Diamond second season – Todoroki Raichi 
 Aldnoah.Zero second season – Slaine Troyard
 Charlotte – Takato 
 Fafner in the Azure: EXODUS – Kaburagi Sui
 Ghost in the Shell: Arise – Alternative Architecture – Vrinda Jr.
 Gintama – Kurokono Tasuke
 Kuroko's Basketball 3 – Tetsuya Kuroko
 Maria the Virgin Witch – Joseph
 Pokémon XY – Alan (Alain)
 Seraph of the End – Mikaela Hyakuya
 Star-Myu: High School Star Musical – Toru Nayuki 
 Samurai Warriors – Toyotomi Hideyori
 Q Transformers: Return of the Mystery of Convoy – Hot Rod
 Q Transformers: Saranaru Ninki Mono e no Michi – Hot Rod
 Yu-Gi-Oh! ARC-V – Yuya Sakaki, Yuri
2016
 All Out!! – Ōharano Etsugo 
 Bungo Stray Dogs – Ryūnosuke Akutagawa
 Bungo Stray Dogs 2 – Ryūnosuke Akutagawa
 Endride – Asanaga Shun 
 Luck & Logic – Tsurugi Yoshichika 
 Momokuri – Seichiro Usami 
 Pocket Monsters: XY&Z – Alain
 Prince of Stride Alternative – Kohinata Hozumi 
 ReLIFE – Arata Kaizaki
 Tanaka-kun Is Always Listless – Tanaka
 Tsukiuta. The Animation – Kanazuki Iku
 Www.Working!! – Shindo Yuta 
 Yu-Gi-Oh! ARC-V – Yuya Sakaki, Yuri, Zarc
 Yuri!!! on Ice – Phichit Chulanont
2017
 Akashic Records of Bastard Magic Instructor – Kleitos Leos
 Boruto: Naruto Next Generations – Shikadai Nara, Akuta
 Ikemen Sengoku: Toki o Kakeru ga Koi wa Hajimaranai – Sanada Yukimura
 Love Tyrant – Seiji Aino
 Rage of Bahamut: Virgin Soul – Visponti Alessand 
 Star-Myu: High School Star Musical 2 – Toru Nayuki 
 Tsuredure Children – Akagi Masafumi 
2018
 Aikatsu Friends! – Maito Chono
 Attack on Titan Third Season – Floch Forster
 Hakata Tonkotsu Ramens – Enokida
 Hakyū Hōshin Engi – Taikobo
 IDOLiSH7 – Nanase Riku
 JoJo's Bizarre Adventure: Golden Wind – Giorno Giovanna/Gold Experience/Gold Experience Requiem
 RErideD: Derrida, who leaps through time – Yvain Derrida 
 Zoku Touken Ranbu: Hanamaru – Monoyoshi Sadamune
 Tsurune – Shū Fujiwara
 Zoids Wild – Arashi
2019
 Ace of Diamond Act II – Todoroki Raichi
 Babylon – Atsuhiko Fumio
 BEM – Belo
 Beyblade Burst GT – Delta Akane
 Bungo Stray Dogs 3 – Ryūnosuke Akutagawa
 Business Fish – Ika
 Fairy Tail – Larcade Dragneel
 My Roommate Is a Cat – Mikazuki Subaru 
 Radiant – Diabal
 Star-Myu: High School Star Musical 3 – Toru Nayuki 
 Vinland Saga – Canute
2020
 Bofuri – Payne
 IDOLiSH7 Second Beat! – Nanase Riku
 Ikebukuro West Gate Park – Kurō
 The Gymnastics Samurai –  Leonardo
 Tsukiuta. The Animation 2 – Kanazuki Iku
 Uchitama?! Have you seen my Tama? – Pochi Yamada
 Woodpecker Detective's Office – Taro Hirai
2021
 2.43: Seiin High School Boys Volleyball Team – Kimichika Haijima
 Attack on Titan: The Final Season  – Floch Forster
 Back Arrow – Bit Namital
 Bungo Stray Dogs Wan! – Ryūnosuke Akutagawa
 Cestvs: The Roman Fighter – Ruska
 Dr. Stone: Stone Wars – Ukyō Saionji
 IDOLiSH7 Third Beat! – Nanase Riku
 Komi Can't Communicate – Mono Shinobino
 My Hero Academia Season 5 – Oboro Shirakumo
 Night Head 2041 – Yūya Kuroki
 SK8 the Infinity – Tadashi Kikuchi
 Vivy: Fluorite Eye's Song – Tatsuya Saeki
2022
 Aoashi – Taira Nakamura
 Call of the Night – Mahiru Seki
 Fantasia Sango - Realm of Legends – Ōki
 I'm Quitting Heroing – Leo Demonheart
 Komi Can't Communicate 2nd Season – Mono Shinobino
 Love All Play – Taichi Higashiyama
 Shadows House 2nd Season – Christopher/Anthony
 Spy × Family – Yuri Briar
 Summer Time Rendering – Sō Hishigata
 Tiger & Bunny 2nd Season – Mugan
 Tomodachi Game – Kei Shinomiya
 Tribe Nine – Eiji Todoroki
2023
 Bofuri 2nd Season – Payne
 Bungo Stray Dogs 4 – Ryūnosuke Akutagawa
 Hell's Paradise: Jigokuraku – Tōma Yamada Asaemon
 The Legendary Hero Is Dead! – Friedrich Norstein
 Tsurune: The Linking Shot – Shū Fujiwara
 Vinland Saga Season 2 – Canute

Original net animation
 Momokuri (2015) – Seiichiro Usami
 7 Seeds (2019) – Ango
 Japan Sinks: 2020 (2020) – Kaito
 Hanma Baki - Son of Ogre (2021) – Chamomile Lessen
 Gundam Breaker Battlogue (2021) – Ryūsei Fudо̄
 Bastard!! -Heavy Metal, Dark Fantasy- (2022) – Kall-Su

Original video animation
 Beyond (The Animatrix) (2003) – Manabu
 Submarine 707R (2003) – Kenji Manahaya
 Coicent (2011) – Kakimono, Shinichi
 Ghost in the Shell: Arise (2014) – Vrinda, Jr.
 Mobile Suit Gundam: The Origin (2017)
 Hi Score Girl: Extra Stage (2019) – Sasquatch Tamagawagakuenmae

Anime films
 Legend of the Millennium Dragon (2011) – Tendo Jun 
 Saint Seiya: Legend of Sanctuary (2014) – Cygnus Hyōga
 Boruto: Naruto the Movie (2015) – Shikadai Nara 
 A Silent Voice (2016) – Nagatsuka Tomohiro 
 Kuroko's Basketball The Movie: Last Game (2017) — Kuroko Tetsuya
 Pretty Cure Super Stars (2018) – Clover
 Bungo Stray Dogs: Dead Apple (2018) – Ryūnosuke Akutagawa
 A Whisker Away (2020) – Masamichi Isami
 BEM: Become Human (2020) – Belo
 Mobile Suit Gundam: Hathaway (2021) – Hathaway Noa/Mafty Navue Erin
 The Orbital Children (2022) – Taiyō Tsukuba
 Rakudai Majo: Fūka to Yami no Majo (2023) – Keith

Video games
 Winnie the Pooh: Pre School (1999) – Christopher Robin
 Eureka Seven Vol.1: New Wave (2005) – Natabachi's brother
 Shinreigari/Ghost Hound DS (2008) – Tarō Kōmori
 Sky Crawlers: Innocent Aces (2008) – Kō Ukumori
 Dissidia 012 Final Fantasy (2011) – Vaan
 Granblue Fantasy (2013) – Ayer, Baal
 Tokyo Ghoul: Jail (2015) – Rio
 Yu-Gi-Oh-ARC-V Tag Force Special (2015) – Sakaki Yuya
 IDOLiSH7 (2015) – Nanase Riku
 Touken Ranbu (2015) – Monoyoshi Sadamune (物吉貞宗)
 Prince of Stride (2015) – Hozumi Kohinata
Ikémen Sengoku: Romances Across Time (2015) – Sanada Yukimura
Dissidia Final Fantasy NT (2015) – Vaan
Final Fantasy Explorers (2016) – Vaan
 Dissidia Final Fantasy Opera Omnia (2017) – Vaan
 Food Fantasy (2018) – B-52, Napoleon Cake, Brownie
 Final Fantasy Brave Exvius: War of the Visions (2019) – Mont Leonis
 Saint Seiya Awakening (2019) - Wolf Nachi
 JoJo's Bizarre Adventure: Last Survivor (2019) – Giorno Giovanna
 Genshin Impact (2020) - Diluc Ragnvindr
 Helios Rising Heroes (2020)-Marion Blythe
Jump Force (2020) - Giorno Giovanna (DLC)
Cookie Run: Kingdom (2021) - Knight Cookie
Yu-Gi-Oh! Duel Links (2021) - Yuya Sakaki
Arknights (2022) - Enforcer
JoJo's Bizarre Adventure: All Star Battle R (2022) - Giorno Giovanna
Triangle Strategy (2022) - Serenoa Wolffort

Radio dramas
 Samurai Shodown: Warriors Rage (Radio Drama) – Seishiro Kuki
 Kuroko's Basketball – Kuroko Tetsuya

Drama CD
 Tsukiuta – Kannadzuki Iku
 Ikemen Sengoku: Romances Across Time – Sanada Yukimura

Dubbing

Live-action
 Daniel Radcliffe
 Harry Potter series – Harry Potter
 December Boys – Maps
 The Woman in Black – Arthur Kipps
 A Young Doctor's Notebook – Young Doctor
 Kill Your Darlings – Allen Ginsberg
 Horns – Ignatius "Ig" Perrish
 Victor Frankenstein – Igor Straussman
 Now You See Me 2 – Walter Mabry
 Swiss Army Man – Manny
 Guns Akimbo – Miles Lee Harris
 The Lost City – Abigail Fairfax
 Dessau Dancers – Frank (Gordon Kämmerer)
 Dragonheart: Battle for the Heartfire – Edric (Tom Rhys Harries)
 Dunkirk – Tommy (Fionn Whitehead)
 Free Guy – Keys (Joe Keery)
 Jeepers Creepers 2 – Billy Taggart (Shaun Fleming)
 Maleficent: Mistress of Evil – Prince Phillip (Harris Dickinson)
 Max Keeble's Big Move – Max Keeble (Alex D. Linz)
 Me and Earl and the Dying Girl – Greg Gaines (Thomas Mann)
 Molly's Game – Player X (Michael Cera)
 Mulan – Cricket (Jun Yu)
 Mystic River – Young Dave Boyle (Cameron Bowen)
 The Nutcracker and the Four Realms – Captain Philip Hoffman (Jayden Fowora-Knight)
 Pearl Harbor – Young Rafe McCawley (Jesse James)
 The Pillars of the Earth – Eustace (Douglas Booth)
 Seabiscuit – Young Red Pollard (Michael Angarano)
 West Side Story – Riff (Mike Faist)

Animation
 All Saints Street - Evan
 The Cuphead Show! – Mugman
 Return to Never Land – Slightly
 Spider-Man: Into the Spider-Verse – Miles Morales / Spider-Man
 Toy Story 3 – Andy Davis

Theater

2001
 Elisabeth – Young Rudolf
 The Lion King – Young Simba
2003
 Sans Famille– Capi
2004
 Sans Famille – Capi
2005
 The Secret Garden – Dickon
2006
 Sans Famille – Capi
2008
 Night on the Galactic Railroad

2009
 Love on the planet〜
 Break Through! (パッチギ! Pacchigi!)
 Banana Fish
2011
 Musical Prince of Tennis – second season – Muromachi
 Switching On Summer-
2012
 Musical Prince of Tennis – second season – Muromachi
 Hybrid Project　Vol.6 FLYING PANCAKE
2014
 Musical Prince of Tennis – second season – Muromachi
2016
 Kuroko no Basuke Stage – Kuroko Tetsuya　4月8日– 24日

Photobook
 Kensho was released on 10 January 2015.

Discography

Studio albums

Extended plays

Singles

References

External links
  
 Official agency profile 
 Kenshō Ono at GamePlaza-Haruka Voice Acting Database 
 
 

1989 births
Living people
Best Actor Seiyu Award winners
Japanese male child actors
Japanese male film actors
Japanese male musical theatre actors
Japanese male pop singers
Japanese male television actors
Japanese male video game actors
Japanese male voice actors
Male voice actors from Fukuoka Prefecture
Seiyu Award winners
20th-century Japanese male actors
21st-century Japanese male actors
21st-century Japanese male singers
21st-century Japanese singers